Maurice Paul Auguste Charles Fabry  (11 June 1867 – 11 December 1945) was a French physicist.

Life

Fabry graduated from the École Polytechnique in Paris and received his doctorate from the University of Paris in 1892, for his work on interference fringes, which established him as an authority in the field of optics and spectroscopy. In 1904, he was appointed Professor of Physics at the University of Marseille, where he spent 16 years.

Career

In optics, he discovered an explanation for the phenomenon of interference fringes. Together with his colleague Alfred Pérot he invented the Fabry–Pérot interferometer in 1899. He and Henri Buisson discovered the ozone layer in 1913.

In 1921, Fabry was appointed Professor of General Physics at the Sorbonne and the
first director of the new Institute of Optics.  In 1926 he also became professor at the École Polytechnique. He was the first general director of the Institut d'optique théorique et appliquée and director of "grande école" École supérieure d'optique (SupOptique). In 1929, he received the Prix Jules Janssen, the highest award of the Société astronomique de France, the French astronomical society.

Fabry was the President of the Société astronomique de France from 1931-1933.

During his career Fabry published 197 scientific papers, 14 books, and over 100 popular articles. For his important scientific achievements he received the Rumford Medal from the Royal Society of London in 1918. In the United States his work was recognized by the Henry Draper Medal from the National Academy of Sciences (1919) and the Franklin Medal from the Franklin Institute (1921). In 1927 he was elected to the French Academy of Sciences.

References

External links

 Biography, in French
 Copy of Fabry's "Oeuvres Choisies Publiées à l'Occasion de son Jubilé Scientifique"

1867 births
1945 deaths
French physicists
Optical physicists
École Polytechnique alumni
Members of the French Academy of Sciences
Foreign Members of the Royal Society
Scientists from Marseille
University of Paris alumni
Academic staff of Aix-Marseille University
20th-century French physicists